Xyris fimbriata, the fringed yelloweyed grass, is a North American species of flowering plant in the yellow-eyed-grass family. It is native to the coastal plain of the United States from eastern Texas to New Jersey.

Xyris fimbriata is a perennial herb up to 150 cm (5 feet) tall with grass-like, olive-green leaves up to 70 cm (28 inches) long, and yellow flowers.

References

External links
Photo of herbarium specimen at Missouri Botanical Garden, collected in 1896 near Apalachicola Florida

fimbriata
Flora of the United States
Plants described in 1816
Taxa named by Stephen Elliott